The 1993 World Series of Poker (WSOP) was a series of poker tournaments held at Binion's Horseshoe. Poker professionals Phil Hellmuth and Ted Forrest would both win three bracelets during the 1993 Series.

Preliminary events

Main Event

There were 231 entrants to the main event. Each paid $10,000 to enter the tournament. The first two female players to finish in the money in the main event were Marsha Waggoner, who finished in 19th place, and Wendeen H. Eolis, who finished in 20th place.

Final table

Other High Finishes

NB: This list is restricted to top 30 finishers with an existing Wikipedia entry.

References

World Series of Poker
World Series of Poker